Carlos Enrique "Charlie" Valencia (born October 31, 1974) is an American mixed martial artist. He has fought for the WEC and UFC in their Bantamweight divisions, and is the former King of the Cage Bantamweight Champion. He is one of only two men to ever finish Ian McCall in a professional MMA fight.

Background
Valencia grew up in Rosemead, California as the son of a machinist for an aerospace company and a stay-at-home mother. He has three brothers, two older and one younger. He attended Mark Keppel High in Monterey Park, California. He took sixth in the state championships in his senior year. After high school, he went on to East Los Angeles College where he won a junior college state championship. He moved on to Fresno State where he had a successful career on the Bulldogs wrestling team. He graduated from Fresno State in 1995.

Mixed martial arts career
Valencia made his WEC debut on March 24, 2007 at WEC 26: Condit vs. Alessio and was victorious over Antonio Banuelos via KO. Valencia defeated Ian McCall at WEC 31 via submission (guillotine choke) at 3:19 of the first round.  He most recently defeated Coty Wheeler on October 10, 2009 at WEC 43.

Valencia most recently defeated Japanese striker Akitoshi Tamura on January 10, 2010 at WEC 46.

Valencia was scheduled to face former WEC Bantamweight Champion Eddie Wineland on June 20, 2010 at WEC 49, but Valencia was forced off the card with an injury.

Valencia faced former WEC Bantamweight Champion Miguel Torres on September 30, 2010 at WEC 51. He lost the fight via submission in the second round.

Ultimate Fighting Championship
On October 28, 2010, World Extreme Cagefighting merged with the Ultimate Fighting Championship. As part of the merger, all WEC fighters were transferred to the UFC.

Valencia faced Ivan Menjivar on April 30, 2011 at UFC 129. Valencia lost via first round TKO after a series of elbow strikes and punches.

After the loss, Valencia was released from the promotion.

Personal life
Valencia and his wife Cris have three children.

Championships and accomplishments
King of the Cage
KOTC Bantamweight Championship (one time)

Mixed martial arts record

|-
| Loss
| align=center| 12–7
| Ivan Menjivar
| TKO (elbow and punches)
| UFC 129
| 
| align=center| 1
| align=center| 1:30
| Toronto, Ontario, Canada
| 
|-
| Loss
| align=center| 12–6
| Miguel Torres
| Submission (rear-naked choke)
| WEC 51
| 
| align=center| 2
| align=center| 2:25
| Broomfield, Colorado, United States
| 
|-
| Win
| align=center| 12–5
| Akitoshi Tamura
| Decision (split)
| WEC 46
| 
| align=center| 3
| align=center| 5:00
| Sacramento, California, United States
| 
|-
| Win
| align=center| 11–5
| Coty Wheeler
| Decision (unanimous)
| WEC 43
| 
| align=center| 3
| align=center| 5:00
| San Antonio, Texas, United States
| 
|-
| Win
| align=center| 10–5
| Seth Dikun
| Decision (unanimous)
| WEC 38
| 
| align=center| 3
| align=center| 5:00
| San Diego, California, United States
| 
|-
| Loss
| align=center| 9–5
| Dominick Cruz
| Decision (unanimous)
| WEC 34: Faber vs. Pulver
| 
| align=center| 3
| align=center| 5:00
| Sacramento, California, United States
| 
|-
| Loss
| align=center| 9–4
| Yoshiro Maeda
| KO (kick to the body)
| WEC 32: Condit vs. Prater
| 
| align=center| 1
| align=center| 2:29
| Rio Rancho, New Mexico, United States
| 
|-
| Win
| align=center| 9–3
| Ian McCall
| Submission (guillotine choke)
| WEC 31
| 
| align=center| 1
| align=center| 3:19
| Las Vegas, Nevada, United States
| 
|-
| Loss
| align=center| 8–3
| Brian Bowles
| Submission (rear-naked choke)
| WEC 28
| 
| align=center| 2
| align=center| 2:50
| Las Vegas, Nevada, United States
| 
|-
| Win
| align=center| 8–2
| Antonio Banuelos
| KO (punch)
| WEC 26: Condit vs. Alessio
| 
| align=center| 1
| align=center| 3:12
| Las Vegas, Nevada, United States
|
|-
| Loss
| align=center| 7–2
| Cub Swanson
| TKO (punches)
| KOTC: BOOYAA
| 
| align=center| 1
| align=center| 4:52
| San Jacinto, California, United States
| 
|-
| Loss
| align=center| 7–1
| Urijah Faber
| Submission (rear-naked choke)
| KOTC: Predator
| 
| align=center| 1
| align=center| 3:09
| Globe, Arizona, United States
|
|-
| Win
| align=center| 7–0
| Del Hawkins
| Submission (rear-naked choke)
| KOTC: The Return 2
| 
| align=center| 1
| align=center| 2:04
| San Jacinto, California, United States
| 
|-
| Win
| align=center| 6–0
| Bobby Gamboa
| Decision
| KOTC 33: After Shock
| 
| align=center| 3
| align=center| 5:00
| San Jacinto, California, United States
| 
|-
| Win
| align=center| 5–0
| Greg Mayer
| Submission (heel hook)
| KOTC 29: Renegades
| 
| align=center| 2
| align=center| 1:43
| San Jacinto, California, United States
| 
|-
| Win
| align=center| 4–0
| David Velasquez
| Submission (rear-naked choke)
| KOTC 12: Cold Blood
| 
| align=center| 1
| align=center| 4:43
| San Jacinto, California, United States
|
|-
| Win
| align=center| 3–0
| Bobby Gamboa
| Submission (injury)
| KOTC 11: Domination
| 
| align=center| 1
| align=center| 0:41
| San Jacinto, California, United States
| 
|-
| Win
| align=center| 2–0
| David Velasquez
| Decision (unanimous)
| GC 2: Collision at Colusa
| 
| align=center| 3
| align=center| 5:00
| Colusa, California, United States
| 
|-
| Win
| align=center| 1–0
| Octavio Moreles
| Decision (unanimous)
| CFF: Cobra Open
| 
| align=center| N/A
| align=center| N/A
| Anza, California, United States
|

References

External links
 
 
  Profil de Charlie Valencia sur UFC Fans

American male mixed martial artists
American mixed martial artists of Mexican descent
Bantamweight mixed martial artists
Mixed martial artists utilizing collegiate wrestling
Living people
1974 births
Sportspeople from Los Angeles
People from Rosemead, California
Ultimate Fighting Championship male fighters
American male sport wrestlers
Amateur wrestlers